Sandra Simonds is an American poet, critic and novelist. The author of eight books of poetry, her poems have been included in Best American Poetry and have appeared in literary journals including Poetry, The New Yorker, The New York Times, American Poetry Review, Ploughshares, Granta, Boston Review, and Fence. In 2013, she won a Readers’ Choice Award for her sonnet “Red Wand.” Her poetry reviews have been featured on the Poetry Foundation Website, the New York Times, the Harvard Review and the Kenyon Review.

Simonds earned her Ph.D. in English and Poetry from Florida State University. She lives in Tallahassee, Florida, and is a full professor of English and Humanities at Thomas University in Thomasville, Georgia.

Honors and awards 
 Akron Poetry Prize, 2015
 Best American Poetry 2015
 Best American Poetry 2014
 Cleveland State University Poetry Center Open Competition Prize 2012

Books 
 Assia (Noemi Press, 2023)  
 Triptychs (Wave Books, 2022)  
 Atopia (Wesleyan University Press, 2019)  
 Orlando (Wave Books, 2018)   
 Further Problems with Pleasure (University of Akron Press, 2017)  
 Steal It Back (Saturnalia Books, 2015)  
 The Sonnets (Bloof Books, 2014) 
 Mother Was a Tragic Girl (Cleveland State University Poetry Center, 2012) 
 Warsaw Bikini (Bloof Books, 2009)

Criticism 
 Moving From Elegy to Ecstasy, a Poet Pushes Against the Canon. Review of Roger Reeves, April, 2023.
 A Poet Whose Calling Is Doubt Celebrates Language’s Uncertainty. Review of Heather McHugh, June, 2020.
In *Protest or Celebration, Four Poets Evoke a Sense of Endings. Review of Four Poets. May, 2020.
Review of Ariana Reines's A Sand Book. Jan, 2020.
Riot Girl: Chelsey Minnis’s Unladylike Poetry. April, 2019.

References

Further reading 
 Grogan, Kristin. "Tight Wires: On Sandra Simonds’s “Assia” Los Angeles Review of Books, March 16 2023.
 Turner, Lindsey. "Impossible Epic: On Sandra Simonds's "Orlando"" Los Angeles Review of Books, Dec 3 2018.

External links 
 April. The New Yorker, 2019
 I Love Wine. The New York Times, 2017
 "Poetry is Stupid and I Want to Die" American Poetry Review, 2017
 "Red Wand" Academy of American Poets website, 2013
 "Lines Written on Nursery Wall" Poetry, 2010
 Poetry Foundation website
 Academy of American Poets website

Year of birth missing (living people)
Living people
Thomas University faculty
American women poets
Poets from Florida
Florida State University alumni
Pennsylvania State University alumni
American women academics
21st-century American women